Zappa is a surname. It is an occupational name meaning "farmer", from the Italian word for "hoe" (gardening tool).

Notable people with the name include:
Frank Zappa (1940–1993), an American musician, songwriter, composer, recording engineer, record producer and film director
Ahmet Zappa (born 1974), Frank's son
 Shana Muldoon Zappa (born 1977), American writer and designer of Disney Star Darlings, wife of Ahmet Zappa
Diva Zappa (born 1979), Frank's daughter
Dweezil Zappa (born 1969), Frank's son
Gail Zappa (1945–2015), Frank's wife
Moon Zappa (born 1967), Frank's daughter
Claudio Zappa (born 1997), Italian professional football defender 
Francesco Zappa (1717–1803), Italian composer and cellist of the 18th century
Gino Zappa (1879–1960), Italian economist
Gō Zappa (雑破 業, Zappa Gō, born 1970), Japanese author and anime screenwriter
Guido Zappa (1915–2015), Italian mathematician
Lenny Zappa (born 1987), Australian professional boxer of Italian descent.

See also
Zappacosta (surname)
Zappas

Italian-language surnames